is a national highway of Japan that traverses the prefectures, Aomori and Hokkaido as well as the Tsugaru Strait that separates them. It currently is made up of two sections that travel  from Aomori, north across the Tsugaru Peninsula to Sotogahama where the first section ends at the site of a former ferry to across the Tsugaru Strait to the town, Fukushima. The other section begins at the corresponding former ferry terminal in Fukushima. The road then travels alongside the southern coast of Hokkaido concurrently with National Route 228 to Hakodate where the route meets its northern terminus.

National Route 280's path across Aomori and Hokkaido follows one of the oldest roads in northern Japan, the Matsumaedō. It was established by Tokugawa Ieyasu for government officials traveling through the area as a branch of the Edo Five Routes and it had some defensive importance to the Japanese who feared a Russian incursion into Ezo, which was ruled by the Matsumae clan.

Route description

Aomori Prefecture

From there, the route generally travels northwest through the city streets as it makes its way out of the city. Near Aburakawa Station, the route begins closely paralleling the coast of Aomori Bay, it continues paralleling the coast throughout its path on the Tsugaru Peninsula. In Minmaya at the northern end of the peninsula, the roadway designation switches to National Route 339. At this point a ferry once carried the route across the Tsugaru Strait, but it has ceased operation.

Hokkaido
National Route 280's path through Hokkaido begins at the port where the ferry from Minmaya used to travel to in Fukushima. The road briefly travels southwest to National Route 228. From that junction, National Route 280 runs concurrently with National Route 228 the rest of the way to its northern terminus in Hakodate. The routes run parallel to the southern coast of Hokkaido along the Tsugaru Strait on their way to Hakodate.

History
What is known today as National Route 280 was originally established during the Edo period by Tokugawa Ieyasu as the Matsumaedō. Its primary purpose was for government officials traveling through the area as a branch of the Ōshū Kaidō, one of the Edo Five Routes connecting the capital to the rest of Japan. It also had defensive importance to the Japanese who feared a Russian incursion into Ezo, which was ruled by the Matsumae clan; however, the main threat to Japanese control of the area was rebellion by the native Ainu.

National Route 280 was established by the Cabinet of Japan along the Edo period road and the ferry linking Sotogahama and Fukushima in 1970. The ferry service along National Route 280 was discontinued in 1998, leaving the non-contiguous sections of the route without a direct road link.

List of major junctions
All junctions listed are at-grade intersections unless noted otherwise.

See also

References

External links

280
Roads in Aomori Prefecture
Roads in Hokkaido